Dylan Ludovic Duventru-Huret (born 3 January 1989), commonly known as Dylan in Portugal, is a French professional footballer who plays for Nea Salamina. He primarily plays as an attacking midfielder and a winger. 

He is a former French youth international, having represented his country at under-18 and under-19 level. He joined Marítimo ahead of the 2009–10 season, after spending eight years at his former club Sochaux in France.

Career
Duventru began his football career playing for the Centre de Formation de Paris, a local Parisian youth sporting club designed to cater only to footballers under the age of 19. While at the club, he played alongside his elder brother, Willy. Duventru spent four years at the club, before securing a move to professional club Sochaux in Franche-Comté. While in the club's academy, he played on the under-19 team that won the Coupe Gambardella in 2007. During the 2007–08 season, Duventru began appearing on the club's Championnat de France amateur team in the reserves, making five appearances. The following season, he made 21 appearances netting three goals.

In 2009, Duventru signed with Portuguese Liga club Marítimo. He departed Sochaux without making a professional appearance for the club. He, initially, started with the club's B team in the Terceira Divisão, however, later in the season, he was called up to the senior team and made his professional debut in a league match against Vitória de Setúbal. That was his only appearance of the season.

On 12 July 2018, Duventru signed a one-year contract with Zira FK.

On 15 June 2019, Duventru signed a contract with Sabail FK.

On 7 August 2019, he moved to Olympiakos Nicosia.

Career statistics
(Correct as of 1 October 2010)

Honours

Club 
Sochaux
Coupe Gambardella: 2007

Notes

References

External links
 
 
 

1989 births
Living people
French footballers
Association football midfielders
Primeira Liga players
C.S. Marítimo players
AFC Compiègne players
FC Mantois 78 players
Alki Oroklini players
Zira FK players
Sabail FK players
Azerbaijan Premier League players
Cypriot First Division players
Cypriot Second Division players
Expatriate footballers in Azerbaijan
French expatriate footballers
Expatriate footballers in Portugal
Expatriate footballers in Cyprus
Olympiakos Nicosia players
French expatriate sportspeople in Azerbaijan
Sportspeople from Troyes
Footballers from Grand Est
French expatriate sportspeople in Portugal
French expatriate sportspeople in Cyprus